Dostlik or Dustlik (formerly Chkalov) is a station of the Tashkent Metro on the Oʻzbekiston Line. The station was opened on 6 November 1987 as the eastern terminus of the extension of the line from Toshkent. In 2012 the station's name was changed from Chkalov to Dustlik.

The construction of "Chkalov" metro station domed used reinforced concrete structure. The ceiling is painted in turquoise and decorated with electric lights as babochkek, giving the room an atmosphere of flying. In the center of the column set made of aluminum, in the shape of the radar. The lobby and the staircase walls are covered with white marble Gazgan and the floor surface is covered with gray and black granite. In one of the side walls of the lobby has been established panels devoted to the 50th anniversary of the flight from Moscow (USSR) to Vancouver (USA) over the North Pole without landing, and a bas-relief of Valery Chkalov. In October 2012, these design elements were barbarously destroyed. One solution is aligned with the entrance of the Tashkent mechanical plant.

On 30 August 2020, interchange to Doʻstlik 2 of the newly opened Circle Line became operating.

References

Tashkent Metro stations
Railway stations opened in 1987
1987 establishments in Uzbekistan